Grant Irvine (born 17 March 1991) is an Australian butterfly swimmer. He was part of the 4 × 100 m medley team that won a bronze medal at the 2012 FINA World Swimming Championships (25 m). Two years later he won an individual silver in the 200 m butterfly at the Commonwealth Games.

At the 2016 Summer Olympics, Irvine represented Australia in the 200m butterfly.

References

External links
  (archive 2)
 
 
 
 
 
 
 
 

1991 births
Living people
Australian male butterfly swimmers
World Aquatics Championships medalists in swimming
Olympic swimmers of Australia
Swimmers at the 2016 Summer Olympics
Commonwealth Games medallists in swimming
Commonwealth Games silver medallists for Australia
Swimmers at the 2014 Commonwealth Games
Sportsmen from Queensland
Swimmers from Brisbane
21st-century Australian people
Medallists at the 2014 Commonwealth Games